Conseil scolaire de district catholique de l'Est ontarien is the Roman Catholic separate, French language school board for the Southeastern region of Ontario. It is headquartered in L'Orignal, a largely French-speaking town in eastern Ontario, and serves the counties of Prescott and Russell and Stormont, Dundas and Glengarry. This school board has 32 schools in total, including 7 secondary schools.

Elementary schools
École élémentaire catholique Curé-Labrosse, Saint-Eugène
École élémentaire catholique Du Rosaire, Saint-Pascal-Baylon
École élémentaire catholique Elda-Rouleau, Alexandria
École élémentaire catholique Embrun, Embrun
École élémentaire catholique La Source, Moose Creek
École élémentaire catholique Marie-Tanguay, Cornwall
École élémentaire catholique Notre-Dame, Cornwall
École élémentaire catholique Notre-Dame-du-Rosaire, Crysler
École élémentaire catholique Paul VI, Hawkesbury
École élémentaire catholique Sacré-Coeur, Bourget
École élémentaire catholique Saint-Albert, Saint-Albert
École élémentaire catholique Saint-Grégoire, Vankleek Hill
École élémentaire catholique Saint-Isidore, Saint-Isidore
École élémentaire catholique Saint-Jean-Baptiste, L'Orignal
École élémentaire catholique Saint-Joseph, Russell
École élémentaire catholique Saint-Joseph, Wendover
École élémentaire catholique Saint-Mathieu, Hammond
École élémentaire catholique Saint-Paul, Plantagenet
École élémentaire catholique Saint-Viateur, Limoges
École élémentaire catholique Saint-Victor, Alfred
École élémentaire catholique Sainte-Félicité, Clarence Creek
École élémentaire catholique Sainte-Lucie, Long Sault
École élémentaire catholique Sainte-Trinité, Rockland
École élémentaire catholique de Casselman, Casselman
École élémentaire catholique de l'Ange-Gardien, North Lancaster

Secondary schools
École secondaire catholique Embrun, Embrun
École secondaire catholique L'Escale, Rockland
École secondaire catholique de Casselman, Casselman
École secondaire catholique de Plantagenet, Plantagenet
École secondaire catholique régionale de Hawkesbury, Hawkesbury
École secondaire catholique La Citadelle, Cornwall
École secondaire catholique Le Relais, Alexandria

Former Schools 

 École élémentaire catholique Saint-Gabriel, Cornwall
 École élémentaire catholique Sainte-Thérèse, Cornwall
 École élémentaire catholique Sainte-Marguerite-Bourgeois, Hawkesbury (Closed in 2013)
 École Élémentaire Catholique Saint-Jean-Bosco, Hawkesbury (Closed in 2008)

See also
List of school districts in Ontario
List of high schools in Ontario

References

Roman Catholic school districts in Ontario
French-language school districts in Ontario